Allan Jemmott (15 November 1868 – 14 March 1935) was a Barbadian cricketer. He played in three first-class matches for the Barbados cricket team in 1891/92.

See also
 List of Barbadian representative cricketers

References

External links
 

1868 births
1935 deaths
Barbadian cricketers
Barbados cricketers
People from Saint John, Barbados